Andrzej Ryszard Heidrich (November 6, 1928 – October 20, 2019) was a Polish graphic artist and type designer who designed Polish bank notes. He studied at the Academy of Fine Arts and graduated with honors.

He designed bank notes for the National Bank of Poland since 1960, however the first bank note designed by him that went into circulation was a 500 złoych from 1974 portraying military leader Tadeusz Kościuszko.

He also designed covers and illustrated books by Polish authors such as: Ryszard Kapuściński , Jarosław Iwaszkiewicz, and Leszek Kołakowski. From 1974-1989 he was the chief graphic designer of the Czytelnik Publishing House.

Education

Primary School 
Military Family School in Żoliborz

Middle School 
The middle school of printmaking

High School 
The famous Fine Arts High School

Font design 
The font Bona Nova was designed by Heidrich in 1971.

Book Covers 
Book Covers made by Heidrich include:

 His Master's Voice by Stanisław Lem
 Shah of Shahs by Ryszard Kapuściński
 A Perfect Vacuum by Ryszard Kapuściński

Stamps 

 A line of stamps featuring Historical figures including Meiszko I, Kazimierz Weilki, Kazimierz Jagiellonczyk, Andrzej Frycz Modrzewski, and Tadeusz Tosciuszko.

 A line of stamps featuring Kinds of butterflies.

 A line of stamps featuring medicinal plants.

 A line of stamps featuring landscapes of places in Poland.

 Two stamps of buildings in Kraków.

 Two stamps featuring Nicolaus Copernicus.

 A stamp featuring the Mniszech Palace.

 A stamp for the 20th Anniversary of the Polish People's Republic.
 A stamp featuring a Train.
 A stamp featuring St. Hedwig.
 A stamp featuring Frédéric Chopin.
 A stamp featuring a Brontosaurus.

Work on flags and Coats of arms

Flags 

 Flag of the Lublin Voivodeship (Adopted 14 June 2004)
 Flag of the Masovian Voivodeship (Adopted 29 May 2006)

Coats of arms 

 Coat of arms of the Lublin Voivodeship(Adopted 14 June 2004)
 Coat of arms of the Masovian Voivodeship (Adopted 29 May 2006)

Other Notable Credits 

 Production Designer for 1966 short film Blekitny kaczorek
 Designer of poster for Polish release of Japanese movie Onna no Koyomi
 Designer of poster for the film Spellbound
 Designer of the Medical University of Warsaw's emblem
 The "Gallery of Portraits of Polish Rulers”, 44 watercolour miniatures depicting images of Polish kings and dukes.
 Created design of passports.
 Designed the Eagle emblem on military caps, police badges, and distinctions for Polish soldiers who fought in Iraq and Afghanistan.
 Painted a series of miniatures with images of Mikołaj Rej, Jan Kochanowski, Adam Mickiewicz and Stanisław Wyspiański.

Awards and distinctions 

 Commander 's Cross of the Order of Polonia Restituta - 2014
 Officer's Cross of the Order of Polonia Restituta - 1999
 Knight's Cross of the Order of Polonia Restituta - 1977
 Gold Cross of Merit - 1977
 Gold Medal for Merit to Culture – Gloria Artis - 2006
 Medal of the 40th anniversary of People's Poland
 Medal for Merit to Banking - 1989

References 

1928 births
2019 deaths
Polish graphic designers
Polish typographers and type designers
Artists from Warsaw